The Golden Valley County Courthouse is a historic courthouse in the city of Beach in Golden Valley County, North Dakota. The courthouse was built in 1923 in the Federal Revival style; it is one of two courthouses in North Dakota to have been built in this style, the other being the Logan County Courthouse. It was added to the National Register of Historic Places on November 14, 1985.

References

External links

Courthouses on the National Register of Historic Places in North Dakota
Government buildings completed in 1923
County courthouses in North Dakota
National Register of Historic Places in Golden Valley County, North Dakota
Federal architecture in North Dakota
1923 establishments in North Dakota